Juhan Ennulo (bon Johannes Orik; 3 January 1898 Vana-Võidu Parish (now Viljandi Parish), Kreis Fellin – 27 February 1982 Tallinn) was an Estonian politician. He was a member of I Riigikogu, representing the Estonian Social Democratic Workers' Party. He was a member of the Riigikogu since 2 March 1923. He replaced Aleksander Tulp. On 12 March 1923, he resigned his position and he was replaced by Peeter Adamson.

References

1898 births
1982 deaths
People from Viljandi Parish
People from Kreis Fellin
Estonian Social Democratic Workers' Party politicians
Members of the Riigikogu, 1920–1923
Estonian physicians
Hugo Treffner Gymnasium alumni
University of Tartu alumni